Sergei Valeryevich Lutsevich (born 22 June 1975 in Krasnodar) is a former Russian football player.

References

1975 births
Sportspeople from Krasnodar
Living people
Russian footballers
FC Chernomorets Novorossiysk players
Russian Premier League players
FC Slavyansk Slavyansk-na-Kubani players
Association football midfielders